Jacob de Haas (13 August 1872 – 21 March 1937) was a British-born Jewish journalist and an early leader of the Zionist movement in the United States.

Biography
Jacob De Haas was born in London. He was the secretary of the First Zionist Congress and introduced Theodor Herzl to the UK in the Jewish World newspaper. In 1896, he became the first member of Hovevei Zion to encourage the movement to adopt the political Zionist program of Theodor Herzl. At the Third Zionist Congress in 1899, he and L. J. Greenberg were elected as members of the Zionist Organization's Propaganda Committee.

He moved to the United States in 1902.  Theodor Herzl had suggested to Richard Gottheil that he hire de Haas as the new secretary of the Federation of American Zionists (FAZ) to replace Stephen Samuel Wise.  De Haas assumed the leadership of the fragmented American Zionist movement.  One of his best known relationships was his friendship with Louis Brandeis, the most widely known and admired secular Jew in America. De Haas introduced Brandeis to the ideas of Theodor Herzl and ideals of Zionism. After a relatively short period of examination and self-examination, Louis Brandeis became an ardent, committed Zionist in 1908. More importantly, Brandeis would head the FAZ and the American Zionist movement by 1912. 

De Haas died at Mount Sinai Hospital in New York City on 21 March 1937 after a lengthy illness.

Selected bibliography 
 Editor of the "Jewish World" (1892-1900), London
 Editor of "The Jewish Advocate" (1908-1918), Boston
 Author of "Theodor Herzl, a biographical study", New York City, 1927. (2 volumes)
 Editor of The Encyclopedia of Jewish Knowledge (1934),  New York City and London
 Author of History of Palestine: The Last Two Thousand Years (1934), in New York City

References

External links 

 Personal papers of Jacob de Haas are kept at the   Central Zionist Archives in Jerusalem. The notation of the record group is A404.
 Louis Dembitz Brandeis Boston Homes by Michael Alan Ross at www.gis.net

American Zionists
British Jews
1872 births
1937 deaths
Zionism in the United States
British newspaper editors
Hovevei Zion